The 1974 South American Championships in Athletics  were held in Santiago, Chile, between 16 and 21 April.

Medal summary

Men's events

Women's events

Medal table

External links
 Men Results – GBR Athletics
 Women Results – GBR Athletics
 Medallists

S
South American Championships in Athletics
International athletics competitions hosted by Chile
1974 in South American sport
1974 in Chilean sport